Samuel Greeley Hilborn (December 9, 1834 – April 19, 1899) was a U.S. Representative from California in the late 19th Century.

Early life

Born in Minot, Androscoggin (then Cumberland) County, Maine, Hilborn attended the common schools, Hebron Academy, and Gould's Academy, Bethel, Maine, and was graduated from Tufts College, Medford, Massachusetts, in 1859.
He studied law and was admitted to the bar in 1861.
He moved to California, Vallejo, Solano County, and engaged in the practice of law.

Career
He served in the State senate 1875-1879.
He served as member of the constitutional convention in 1879.
He moved to San Francisco, California, in 1883.
He was appointed by President Arthur United States district attorney for the district of California and served from 1883 to 1886.
He moved to Oakland in 1887 and continued the practice of his profession.

Hilborn was elected as a Republican to the Fifty-second Congress to fill the vacancy caused by the resignation of Joseph McKenna.
Presented credentials as a Member-elect to the Fifty-third Congress and served from December 5, 1892, until April 4, 1894, when he was succeeded by Warren B. English, who contested his election.

Hilborn was elected to the Fifty-fourth and Fifty-fifth Congresses (March 4, 1895 – March 3, 1899).
He was an unsuccessful candidate for renomination in 1898.

Later life and death
He lived in retirement until his death in Washington, D.C., April 19, 1899.
He was interred in Rock Creek Cemetery.

References

1834 births
1899 deaths
People from Minot, Maine
Tufts University alumni
Republican Party members of the United States House of Representatives from California
United States Attorneys for the District of California
19th-century American politicians
Politicians from Vallejo, California